DJ Koo may refer to:

 DJ Koo (South Korean musician)
 DJ Koo (Japanese musician)